Earwig is the second album by the Blake Babies, released in 1989 (see 1989 in music).

Critical reception
Trouser Press called the album "consistently attractive textured guitar pop." The Rolling Stone Album Guide called it "a strong debut."

Track listing
All songs written and composed by Juliana Hatfield except as noted.
"Cesspool" – 3:16 (Hatfield, John Strohm)
"Dead and Gone" – 3:47 (Hatfield, Strohm)
"Grateful" – 3:07
"You Don't Give Up" – 3:40
"Your Way Or The Highway" – 2:42
"Rain" – 3:34 (Strohm)
"Lament" – 3:27 (Hatfield, Strohm)
"Alright" – 2:31
"Loose" – 2:49 (The Stooges)
"Take Your Head Off My Shoulder" – 1:26 (Hatfield, Strohm)
"From Here To Burma" – 2:03 (Hatfield, Strohm)
"Don't Suck My Breath" – 2:49
"Outta My Head" – 2:02
"Steamy Gregg" – 1:31
"Not Just A Wish" - 1:44

Personnel
Juliana Hatfield - vocals, bass and guitar
John Strohm - guitar and vocals
Freda Boner (also known as Freda Love) - drums
Evan Dando - bass and backing vocals
Andrew Mayer - bass

Production
Producers: Gary Smith
Engineers: Paul Q. Kolderie and Sean Slade
Design: Lewis Lane
Cover Art: Nicolette Nargesian
Photography: Jen Wheeler

References

Blake Babies albums
1989 albums
Albums produced by Gary Smith (record producer)